Juan de La Cruz Matto González (born 14 September 1977 in Itá, Paraguay) is a Paraguayan association football defender who plays for Chaco For Ever of the Torneo Argentino A in Argentina.

Teams
  Atlético Colegiales 2001
  Sport Colombia 2002
  Sportivo Luqueño 2003
  Deportes La Serena 2004
  Unión de Sunchales 2005–2007
  12 de Octubre 2007
  9 de Julio de Rafaela 2008
  Central Norte 2008–2010
  Sport Huancayo 2010
  Crucero del Norte 2011–2013
  Chaco For Ever 2013–present

References
 

Paraguayan people of Italian descent
Paraguayan footballers
Paraguayan expatriate footballers
Atlético Colegiales players
Sportivo Luqueño players
Crucero del Norte footballers
12 de Octubre Football Club players
Sport Huancayo footballers
Deportes La Serena footballers
Expatriate footballers in Chile
Expatriate footballers in Argentina
Expatriate footballers in Peru
1977 births
Living people
9 de Julio de Rafaela players
Association football defenders